John Adams (June 1, 1819October 18, 1908) was an American businessman, Democratic politician, and Wisconsin pioneer.  He served two years in the Wisconsin State Senate and three years in the State Assembly, representing eastern Dane County.  He was the father of Alva Adams, who served three terms as Governor of Colorado.

Biography
Adams was born in Pulaski County, Kentucky on June 1, 1819. He and a half-brother relocated to Indiana around 1832, then Illinois in 1837, and finally to Dodgeville, Wisconsin, where he was engaged in lead mining. Adams moved to Blue Mounds, Wisconsin, in 1849, to Black Earth, Wisconsin, in 1863, and later to  Blanchardville, Wisconsin, where he built a grist mill. He moved to Pasadena, California in 1890.

Adams married Eliza Blanchard (1832–1911) in 1846. His sons, Alva Adams and Billy Adams, became Governor of Colorado. One grandson, Alva B. Adams, became a member of the United States Senate. Another grandson, Harry W. Adams, became Mayor of Beloit, Wisconsin. Adams died in Pasadena, California.

Career
Adams was a member of the Assembly during the 1869, 1870 and 1872 sessions. He was a member of the Senate from the 26th District during the 1882 and 1883 sessions. In addition, he was Postmaster and Chairman of the Town Board (similar to city council) of Black Earth (town), Wisconsin and a member of the County Board of Dane County, Wisconsin. Adams was a Democrat.

References

External links
The Political Graveyard

People from Black Earth, Wisconsin
Democratic Party Wisconsin state senators
Democratic Party members of the Wisconsin State Assembly
Wisconsin city council members
Wisconsin postmasters
1819 births
1908 deaths
Burials in Wisconsin
19th-century American politicians
County officials in Wisconsin